Jeffrey Caine (born 1944) is a British screenwriter. He was nominated for the Academy Award for Best Adapted Screenplay in 2005 for The Constant Gardener.

He was educated at the University of Sussex and the University of Leeds.

Filmography

Film

Television

References

External links

1944 births
British male actors
British male screenwriters
Living people